Headwall Lake is an alpine lake in Custer County, Idaho, United States, located in the White Cloud Mountains in the Sawtooth National Recreation Area.  The lake is accessed from Sawtooth National Forest trail 683.

Headwall Lake is northwest of Merriam Peak and located in the lower section of the Boulder Chain Lakes Basin.

See also
List of lakes of the White Cloud Mountains
Hourglass Lake
Hummock Lake
Scoop Lake
Sawtooth National Recreation Area
White Cloud Mountains

References

Lakes of Idaho
Lakes of Custer County, Idaho
Glacial lakes of the United States
Glacial lakes of the Sawtooth National Forest